, formerly Oriental Light and Magic, is a Japanese animation and film studio headquartered in Setagaya, Tokyo, Japan, founded on October 3, 1990.

Establishment 
OLM was founded as Oriental Light & Magic, Inc. on October 3rd, 1990 by Toshiaki Okuno, Shūkichi Kanda, Shōji Ōta, Kunihiko Yuyama, Naohito Takahashi, Yuriko Chiba, Nobuyuki Wasaki, Tsukasa Koitabashi, and Takaya Mizutani, all of which were formerly affiliated with Studio Gallop or OB Planning Co., Ltd. Their name is derived from the American special effects studio Industrial Light & Magic.

In 1995, OLM representative director Toshiaki Okuno founded OLM Digital, which became the main CG work company behind a majority of OLM's works. Toshiaki Okuno stands as both companies' representative director.

Studio structure
Similar to other anime studios, OLM is separated into distinct production teams that are responsible for certain series or franchises. They are unique in the regard that they are distinctly credited in productions.

Works

Video games

TV series

Films

Original video/net animations

Specials 
 Pac's Scary Halloween (2015)
 Santa Pac's Merry Berry Day (2015)

Game 
 Pokémon Black and White 2 Animated Trailer (2012)

Distribution/dubbing 
 PAW Patrol (2019–present)
 Tinpo (2020–present)
 D.N. Ace

Notes

References

External links 

 
 

 
Japanese animation studios
Animation studios in Tokyo
Mass media companies established in 1990
Japanese companies established in 1990
Setagaya
Imagica Robot Holdings
Video game companies of Japan
Video game development companies